HD 8535 is a star located 181 light years away from the Sun in the southern constellation of Phoenix. It has a yellow hue and can be viewed using binoculars or a small telescope, having a low apparent visual magnitude of 7.70. The star is drifting further away from the Sun with a radial velocity of +2.4 km/s.

This is an ordinary G-type main-sequence star with a stellar classification of G0V. The luminosity class of 'V' indicates the star is generating energy through core hydrogen fusion. It is about two billion years old and is spinning slowly with a projected rotational velocity of 3 km/s. The abundance of elements other than hydrogen and helium in the star – what astronomers term metallicity – is about the same as in the Sun. It has 17% more mass than the Sun and an 18% greater radius. The star is radiating 1.85 times the luminosity of the Sun from its photosphere at an effective temperature of 6,200 K.

The survey in 2015 have ruled out the existence of any stellar companions at projected distances above 23 astronomical units.

Planetary system
In 2009, a gas giant was found in orbit around the star using the radial velocity method.

See also 
 List of extrasolar planets

References 

G-type main-sequence stars
Planetary systems with one confirmed planet
Phoenix (constellation)
Durchmusterung objects
008535
006511